Chenareh-ye Ali Madad (also Romanized as Chenāreh-ye ‘Alī Madad; also known as Chenāreh-ye ‘Alī Mūr) is a village in Jeygaran Rural District, Ozgoleh District, Salas-e Babajani County, Kermanshah Province, Iran. At the 2006 census, its population was 120, in 20 families.

References 

Populated places in Salas-e Babajani County